Jacques Clamorgan was an adventurer, fur trader and land owner from the West Indies.

Life
In 1781, he arrived in St. Louis and soon became wealthy. He laid claim to over 1 million acres of Upper Louisiana land. The government offered $8 million (In 2011 $US) in response to Clamorgan's land claims. Clamorgan refused to accept the money. Due to Clamorgan's power in the region he was given a seat in the Court of Quarter Sessions, a governmental body that existed for St. Louis composed of Judicial, Executive and Legislative powers.

In a tax evasion effort, Clamorgan set his slave concubine free in order to give her some of his land holdings. Ester, the freed slave, would later sue Clamorgan for rightful ownership of this land when he demanded it back. Ester would later win through a series of lawsuits and became one of the richest colored people in the area.

Death
Clamorgan died in November 1814 leaving behind several mulatto children and his vast wealth. His grandson, Cyprian Clamorgan, wrote a book entitled The Colored Aristocracy of St. Louis.

References

People of Louisiana (New France)
American people of West Indian descent
People from St. Louis
People from St. Louis County, Missouri
1814 deaths
Year of birth missing